The FIBT World Championships 2013 took place at the St. Moritz-Celerina Olympic Bobrun in St. Moritz, Switzerland for the record twenty-second time, after hosting the event previously in 1931 (Four-man), 1935 (Four-man), 1937 (Four-man), 1938 (Two-man), 1939 (Two-man), 1947, 1955, 1957, 1959, 1965, 1970, 1974, 1977, 1982, 1987, 1989 (Skeleton), 1990 (Bobsleigh), 1997 (Bobsleigh), 1998 (Skeleton), 2001 (Men's bobsleigh), and 2007.

Switzerland was scheduled to host the 2012 World Championships, but the 2012 location was switched to Lake Placid, New York in December 2010. The FIBT switched the locations to accommodate a shorter trip for athletes and equipment to Sochi, Russia in 2013 so that athletes will gain practice time on the 2014 Olympic track in Sochi.

Bobsleigh

Two men

Four men

Two women

Skeleton

Men

Women

Mixed team
The mixed team eventconsisting of one run each of men's skeleton, women's skeleton, 2-man bobsleigh, and 2-women bobsleighdebuted at the 2007 championships. The United States won its second consecutive mixed team championship.

Medal table

External links
 Official 2013 Worlds website

References

 
 Bobsleigh Two men results
Bobsleigh Four men results
 Bobsleigh Two woman results
Skeleton men results
Skeleton women results
 Mixed team results

IBSF World Championships
International sports competitions hosted by Switzerland
Sport in St. Moritz
World Championships
World Championships
FIBT World Championships
Bobsleigh in Switzerland